The Internet Cat Video Festival was a national competition that celebrates cat videos on the internet.  Many of these festivals include appearances by special guests and celebricats (such as Grumpy Cat and the creator of Nyan Cat), live music, costume contests, art projects, and booths hosting local animal resource nonprofits.  The 2013 Minneapolis show featured a cat sculpture made out of butter.

From Conception - 2015

The idea for the first Internet Cat Video Festival came from Katie Hill, a program associate at the Walker Art Center, who suggested it early in 2012 as a sort of joke.  The Festival quickly became a viral phenomenon, drawing a crowd of more than 10,000 fans to the Walker's Open Field.  The event caught the attention of local, national, and international audiences and media including the New York Times. Walker Art Center was joined by community partners Feline Rescue, Animal Humane Society, and The Wildcat Sanctuary.

After the inaugural event, the Internet Cat Video Festival went on tour.  Stops included UMass, Boston, the Museum of Photographic Arts in San Diego, and Memphis' Brooks Museum. The festival was even included in the Vienna Independent Shorts in Vienna, Austria and the Jerusalem Film Festival.

The next big Fest took place in Oakland, CA on May 11, 2013.  All profits benefitted the East Bay SPCA.  On June 21 and 22, 2013, the Cat Video Fest was at Portland's Hollywood Theatre in partnership with the Theatre's "Future So Bright" project.

On Saturday, October 19, 2013, the Cat Video Festival was held in Chicago, IL, supported by the Chicago Cat Rescue and Tree House.

Moving into the second year, catvidfest was booked for 15 tour dates, including festivals in San Francisco, Chicago, Brooklyn, and New York, plus experimental versions at ArtPrize in Grand Rapids, Michigan, and at CultureTECH in Derry Northern Ireland.  In 2013, the Internet Cat Video Festival returned to Minneapolis and screens at the Great Minnesota Get-Together: the State Fair Grandstand.

The third Internet Cat Video Film Festival was held at Walker's Open Field on August 14, 2014.

The fourth and last Film Festival took place in 2015. Walker Art Center discontinued the event "to put our resources towards the remodeling of [the] campus including the Minneapolis Sculpture Garden,” according to spokeswoman Rachel Joyce. All of the festival memorabilia was given to the Minnesota Historical Society.

St. Paul Saints’ Cat Video Festival (2015 - ) 
Despite no longer being involved with the Walker Art Center, the festival has been an annual tradition in the Twin Cities (Minnesota). After the Walker ended its involvement in 2015, the St. Paul Saints and CHS Field adopted hosted the event. 

In 2020, the now St. Paul Saints’ Cat Video Festival went virtual. In 2021 the plan is to bring it back in person.

Media 
The Festival uses the Twitter hashtag #catvidfest.  The first nominations for #catvidfest closed July 30, 2012. Festival mastermind Katie Hill "watched every single [of the 10,000 submissions], eventually boiling them down into 65 minutes of concentrated kitty shenanigans". The final chosen videos were divided into CATegories like comedy, documentary, animated, foreign, etc. The "People's Choice" vote was open from August 6 – 12, 2012. This "Golden Kitty award", chosen by visitors to the Walker's Web site, went to Will Braden for his two-minute opus "Henri, Paw de Deux".

See also
 Henri, le Chat Noir
 lolcat
 The Internet and cats

References

External links
 Katie Hill's blog post on the first festival
 Internet Cat Video Festival 2012 playlist
 Henri, Paw de Deux, "People's Choice winner," Minneapolis, 2012
 NPR's interview with Scott Stulen, who runs the Internet Cat Video Festival

Streaming television
Cats in popular culture